Alvinocarididae is a family of shrimp, originally described by M. L. Christoffersen in 1986 from samples collected by DSV Alvin, from which they derive their name. Shrimp of the family Alvinocarididae generally inhabit deep sea hydrothermal vent regions, and hydrocarbon cold seep environments. Carotenoid pigment has been found in their bodies. The family Alvinocarididae comprises 7 extant genera.

Species

Alvinocaris
Alvinocaris alexander Ahyong, 2009 – South Pacific Ocean, southern Kermadec ridge, Rumble V seamount (at depths of ) and Brothers Caldera (at depths of ) hydrothermal vent fields. A. alexander closely resembles A. williamsi from the Menez Gwen site on the mid-Atlantic ridge
Alvinocaris dissimilis Komai & Segonzac, 2005 – West Pacific Ocean, Mid-Okinawa Trough; recognised among the paratypes of A. brevitelsonis.
A. komaii is common among chemoautotrophic mussel, Bathymodiolus brevior.
Alvinocaris longirostris Kikuchi & Ohta, 1995 – West Pacific Ocean, Okinawa Trough, Iheya Ridge, Clam and Pyramid hydrothermal vent fields, Sagami Bay seeps, seamounts of Kermadec Ridge off New Zealand; Type locality: West Pacific Ocean, Okinawa Trough, Iheya Ridge, Clam hydrothermal vent field
A. lusca is the only species represented in the East Pacific Ocean.
Alvinocaris markensis Williams, 1988 – North Atlantic Ocean, Snake Pit, TAG, Logatchev, Broken Spur hydrothermal vent fields of the mid-Atlantic ridge (MAR); Type locality: North Atlantic Ocean, mid-Atlantic ridge, Snake Pit hydrothermal vent field.
Alvinocaris niwa Webber, 2004 – Brothers Caldera and Rumble V seamount, south Kermadec Ridge; Type locality: South Pacific Ocean, south Kermadec ridge, Brothers Caldera.

Chorocaris
Chorocaris paulexa Martin & Shank, 2005 – South Pacific Ocean, southern East Pacific Rise, Rapa Nui Homer hydrothermal vent site, ; occurs in large numbers on black smokers.
C. vandoverae is often found with mussels and snails of the genus Alviniconcha.

Mirocaris

M. fortunata has the broadest range of any alvinocaridid shrimp. It is dominant on chimney walls or chimney bases in the southern hydrothermal vent sites (Broken Spur, Rainbow, Lucky Strike, Menez Gwen).

Nautilocaris

Opaepele

Rimicaris

R. exoculata is the most extensively studied species to date, and occurs in active swarms that may be as dense as 2500 individuals per square metre. It occurs on chimney walls in the temperature range .
Rimicaris hybisae Nye, Copley & Plouviez, 2011 - Atlantic Ocean, Mid-Cayman Rise, Piccard and Von Damm hydrothermal vent fields.

Shinkaicaris

References

External links
 Includes video of Mirocaris fortunata, Chorocaris chacei and Rimicaris exoculata.

Caridea
Animals living on hydrothermal vents
Decapod families
Extant Jurassic first appearances